Distocercospora is a genus of three species of plant-pathogenic fungi in the family Mycosphaerellaceae. The genus was circumscribed in 1988 with D. pachyderma as the type species.

References

Capnodiales
Mycosphaerellaceae genera
Taxa described in 1988
Fungal plant pathogens and diseases